Levi Stevens House, also known as the Stevens-Thatcher-Crosson House, is a historic home located at Aurora, Dearborn County, Indiana. It was built in 1849, and is a -story, three bay, Greek Revival style 2/3 I-house.  It has an "L"-shaped plan, sits on a rough cut limestone foundation, and has a low side gable roof.  It has a one-story rear kitchen addition.

It was added to the National Register of Historic Places in 1996.

Facade restoration of paint and shutters was completed in 2018.

References

Houses on the National Register of Historic Places in Indiana
Greek Revival houses in Indiana
Houses completed in 1849
Houses in Dearborn County, Indiana
National Register of Historic Places in Dearborn County, Indiana
1849 establishments in Indiana